The 1983–84 Houston Baptist Huskies men's basketball team represented Houston Baptist University in the 1983–84 college basketball season. This was head coach Gene Iba’s seventh of eight seasons at HBU. The Huskies played their home games at the Sharp Gymnasium and were new members of the Trans America Athletic Conference. After finishing atop the conference regular season standings, the Huskies followed that success by winning the TAAC tournament to receive an automatic bid to the 1984 NCAA tournament – the only appearance in program history. Houston Baptist was beaten by Alcorn State in the play-in round to finish the season 24–7, 11–3 in TAAC play.

Roster

Schedule and results

|-
!colspan=12 style=|Regular Season

|-
!colspan=12 style=|TAAC Tournament

|-
!colspan=12 style=|NCAA Tournament

<ref></ref

References

Houston Christian Huskies men's basketball seasons
Houston Baptist
Houston Baptist
Houston Baptist Huskies basketball
Houston Baptist Huskies basketball